Andrew Hunter Hay was a Scottish amateur football right back who played in the Scottish League for Clydebank and Queen's Park. He was capped by Scotland at amateur level.

References 

Scottish footballers
Queen's Park F.C. players
Scottish Football League players
Scotland amateur international footballers
Place of birth missing
Year of death missing
Place of death missing
1909 births
Airdrieonians F.C. (1878) players
Clydebank F.C. (1914) players
Association football fullbacks